The MV Spokane is a  operated by Washington State Ferries. She was built in 1972 by the Todd Shipyards in Seattle, Washington, for the Seattle–Bainbridge route.

Perhaps one of the most notable features of the Spokane is her colorful interior which she has sported since being rebuilt in the mid 1990s.

Naming

Spokane was named for the Spokane tribe by the Washington State Highway Commission, continuing the tradition of naming ferry vessels for Native American tribes that was started by the Puget Sound Navigation Company. At least seven other vessels had carried the name "Spokane" prior to the launch of the ferry in 1972.

History

Spokane was launched by Todd Shipyards on April 14, 1972, and christened by Carol Stearns of the Spokane tribe. Both vessels cost $17.7 million to construct.

She made her ceremonial maiden voyage on February 13, 1973, departing from Colman Dock in Seattle carrying Governor Dan Evans, the mayors of Seattle and Spokane, and members of the Spokane tribe.

The ferry made her first regular commuter run on the morning of February 24, 1973. Riders onboard complimented the "superferry" on her luxurious look, cleanliness, and handling.

References

External links 

Spokane vessel info from WSDOT

Washington State Ferries vessels
1972 ships
Ships built in Seattle